The fifth season of reality television singing competition American Idol began on January 17, 2006, and concluded on May 24, 2006. Randy Jackson, Paula Abdul and Simon Cowell returned to judge, and Ryan Seacrest returned to host. It is the most successful season to date ratings-wise, and resulted in 18 contestants (including all of the top 10 and a few semifinalists) getting record deals – nine of them with major labels. Taylor Hicks was named the winner over runner-up Katharine McPhee, making him the first male to win against a female in the finals.

Regional auditions
Auditions were held in seven cities in the summer and fall of 2005. An audition was originally planned for Memphis, Tennessee but that was canceled due to the Hurricane Katrina relief effort that was taking place in the city, and replaced by Las Vegas, Nevada and Greensboro, North Carolina.

 Later stages of the Austin auditions were held in San Francisco due to Hurricane Katrina which caused a large number of evacuees to be relocated in Texas. The show however made no mention of the venue switch and presented the Austin audition as having taken place entirely in Austin.

Unlike season four, no guest judges were involved during the auditions. This season used the same rules as season four.

One notable auditioner this season was Paula Goodspeed, a fervent fan of Paula Abdul, who auditioned in Austin. In 2008, Goodspeed made headlines when she committed suicide outside Abdul's home. Abdul later claimed that she had objected beforehand to Goodspeed being at the audition because she knew Goodspeed and had been frightened by her past behavior, but the producers overrode her objection. The producers Ken Warwick and Nigel Lythgoe however denied being aware of her fears or that they would put her in danger.

In Las Vegas, an auditioner Tora Woloshin gained a golden ticket to Hollywood but was disqualified just before she was due to go to Hollywood for unspecified reasons. She later appeared on the first season of X-Factor.

Hollywood week
The Hollywood semifinal rounds were held at the Orpheum Theatre in Los Angeles, California consisting of 175 contestants. The first round of semifinals consisted of solo a cappella performance with each contestant choosing one song out of twelve that were given to each contestant two weeks in advance. Those who did not impress the judges were sent home the following day. After the singles round, the contestants were separated into four groups, with three groups going through (with 44 contestants chosen). In the Pasadena Civic Center, each were individually taken via elevator walking the infamous "mile" to the judges station where the verdict if they would be chosen or not was announced. Twenty were cut and the final twenty-four (12 men and 12 women) were selected.

Semifinals

The live show portion of the semifinals began on February 21, 2006, with the names announced on February 15, 2006. Starting with 12 women and 12 men, the women and men perform on weekly separate shows and on the result shows, and the bottom two contestants each night are eliminated from the competition. The semifinals took place over three weeks, meaning that six from each gender will be eliminated over the course of the competition, leaving the other six to form the top 12. The females performed on the first night, followed by the males thereafter,

The following are semifinalists who did not reach the finals:

 Ayla Brown  (born July 28, 1988) is from Wrentham, Massachusetts. She originally auditioned in Boston, singing "Ain't No Mountain High Enough".
Kinnik Sky  (born May 13, 1977) is from Duluth, Georgia. She auditioned in Greensboro. She was grouped with Nicole Turk, Celeste Scalone and Tyra Schwartz during the group rounds.
Heather Cox  (born November 16, 1983) is from Jonesville, North Carolina. She auditioned in Denver. Grouped with Halicia Thompson and Kellie Pickler during Hollywood group performances.
Brenna Gethers  (born October 7, 1980) is from Mount Vernon, New York. She auditioned in Boston, and was known for her "catty" attitude. She became the lead singer for Bomb Squad, a funk-rock band that won an American Music Award for Best New Music in 2003.
Stevie Scott  (born October 10, 1984) is from Newcastle upon Tyne, England. She auditioned in Denver. She sang "Gold by Spandau Ballet" during performances in Hollywood. She was eliminated on February 23, 2006, along with Becky O'Donohue, Bobby Bennett, and Patrick Hall. 
 Rebecca "Becky" O'Donohue  (born July 13, 1980) is from Dobbs Ferry, New York. Her original audition was in Boston with her twin sister (who did not sing due to recent throat surgery). Simon Cowell praised her looks, but said no to her voice. She was let through to Hollywood by Randy Jackson and Paula Abdul.
Gedeon McKinney  (born October 1, 1988) is from Memphis, Tennessee. He intended to audition in Memphis, but the auditions there were canceled due to the city's role in relief efforts for Hurricane Katrina. He raised funds to travel to the Chicago auditions by putting on a benefit concert. His elimination was a surprise to many, including Simon Cowell, who had criticized him previously. McKinney's father, Tony McKinney, also a performing artist, died in December 2005 before the show aired. In 2018, his younger sister, Evvie won the first season of The Four: Battle for Stardom.
 William "Will" Makar  (born March 2, 1989, in The Woodlands, Texas) attended high school at The Woodlands College Park High School. In high school, Will starred in several musical productions, including The Woodlands College Park High School Musical in January 2006, the performance of which began the day after the airing of his American Idol audition and was covered by local media. He has also performed for Presidents Clinton and Bush and with singer Celine Dion as part of the Houston Children's Chorus. He has performed the National Anthem at many sporting events and was also a member of the band Last Born. During the Hollywood rounds, he performed Fly Me to the Moon with David Radford and Kevin Covais. Will was signed to Double Deal Brand Records, which also signed fellow Top 16 semifinalist Ayla Brown, and released his debut single titled "I Won't Make It Out" on iTunes on April 27, 2007.
José "Sway" Penala  (born January 23, 1978) is from South San Francisco, California, where he also had his audition for the show. He was the only Asian-American who made it to the semifinals that season. He has performed with such groups as DnH and 6th Day. When he competed, on stage, Penala often wore a Fedora hat and coat and military dog tags. He developed friendships with Elliott Yamin, Taylor Hicks, and Chris Daughtry during the season. Elliott was also his Hollywood Week group mate and later his roommate.
 David Radford  (born March 22, 1988, in Crystal Lake, Illinois) was a high school senior at Crystal Lake Central High School. In addition to singing, David plays the trumpet. He originally auditioned in Chicago.
Patrick Hall  (born September 24, 1977) is from Gravette, Arkansas, and was seen for the first time in Hollywood, California. During the Hollywood rounds, Simon Cowell called him 'very likable', and compared him to Clay Aiken. He received many positive comments during these rounds. To separate himself from the Clay Aiken comparison, however, he chose to perform "Come to My Window" in the first week of the Top 24. He was eliminated that week.
Bobby Bennett, Jr.  (born June 4, 1986) is from Denver, Colorado, where his audition was held. He is most known for his rousing rendition of the song "Copacabana" and was named the "showman" of the semifinalists. He also made an appearance in the March 21 episode on which Barry Manilow performed.

Performances
Color key:

Top 24

Top 20

Top 16

Top 12 finalists

Finals 
There are 11 weeks of finals and 12 contestants compete and one finalist eliminated per week based on the American public's votes.

Color key:

Top 12 – Stevie Wonder

Top 11 – 1950s

Top 10 – 2000s

Top 9 – Country

Top 8 – Queen

Top 7 – Great American Songbook

Top 6 – Love Songs

Top 5 – Year of Birth/Current Billboard Top 10

Top 4 – Elvis Presley

Top 3 – Clive Davis's choice/Judges' choice/Contestants' choice

Top 2 – Previous Song/Another Previous Song/Winner's Single

Performers on results shows
March 15 – Stevie Wonder
March 22 – Barry Manilow
March 29 – Shakira and Wyclef Jean – "Hips Don't Lie"
April 5 – Kenny Rogers
April 12 – Final 8 sing a medley of Queen
April 19 – Rod Stewart
April 26 – Andrea Bocelli and David Foster
May 3 – Top 5 perform "Together We Are One" (originally written and sung by Australian singer Delta Goodrem for the 2006 Commonwealth Games)
May 10 – Top 4 perform a medley of Elvis songs
May 17 – Each contestant of the Top 3 performs the song they will be singing on the American Idol Season 5: Encores CD

Elimination song
A new feature this year, the show used a special song to make a tribute to an eliminated contestant's journey on the show, as opposed to before when various different melodic music compositions were played. This year, the song used for an eliminated contestant's flashback tribute was "Bad Day" by Daniel Powter.

The finale
On the finale, Carrie Underwood sang "Don't Forget to Remember Me" solo along with the song "Through the Rain" with the 12 finalists. Also, the finalists performed two medleys: one medley was for the female finalists and the other for the male finalists. Several special guests performed with one of the top five Idols: Al Jarreau (Paris Bennett), Live (Chris Daughtry), Meat Loaf (Katharine McPhee), Mary J. Blige (Elliott Yamin) and Toni Braxton (Taylor Hicks). Clay Aiken performed with lookalike auditioner Michael Sandecki, who resembled Aiken c. his 2005 audition. Also, Prince performed without an Idol. Towards the end of the program, the finalists performed "That's What Friends Are For" with Dionne Warwick as well as other songs in the Burt Bacharach canon, with Burt Bacharach playing the piano. Several auditioners from the first round returned to accept "Golden Idol" awards, and to sing. A parody of Brokeback Mountain (though there was no mention of homosexuality) called "Brokenote Mountain," featuring a group of three failed auditioners (Garet Layne Johnson, Michael Evans, and Matthew Buckstein) was replayed from the Hollywood round. The trio "The Brokenote Cowboys" then performed the Waylon Jennings & Willie Nelson song "Mammas Don't Let Your Babies Grow Up to be Cowboys". In a pre-taped segment, finalist Kellie Pickler ate lunch with Wolfgang Puck at his brasserie as a way of making fun of Kellie's admitted lack of culinary savvy. Finally, just before the results were announced, Hicks and McPhee performed "(I've Had) The Time of My Life".

The chairman of TeleScope Inc., the company which manages the American Idol results, came at the end of the show with the result card. 578 million votes were cast for the season with 63.5 million votes in the finale, and Taylor Hicks was named the winner, the second American Idol winner from the city of Birmingham, Alabama (the first being Ruben Studdard), and the fourth finalist with close ties to the city.

Elimination chart
Color key:

DialIdol

DialIdol is both the name of a computer program for Microsoft Windows and its associated website that began tracking contestants during season four and sprang to prominence at the start of season five. The program allowed users to automatically vote for the American Idol contestants of their choice using their PC's phone modem. The program then reported back to the main website, which kept track of the results based on the percentage of calls for each contestant that result in a busy signal. Based on the data received, the website then predicted which contestants may be eliminated or may be in danger of being eliminated. As of May 25, 2006, its predictions for season five were 87% accurate.

This was the first season in which the free US public service website, Zabasearch.com, started to openly present voting results (starting with the top 12 and onward) that it claimed were from Cingular and American Idol. It has experienced controversy over the fact that its results changed throughout the day until (and often through) the results show.

Controversies

 In January 2006, twins Derrell and Terrell Brittenum were charged with forgery and theft after allegedly using a false identity to purchase a car.  This occurred after the "Hollywood" portion of the show was filmed, and the twins were subsequently disqualified.
 In February 2006, it was discovered that José "Sway" Penala was reportedly signed to E-Real Record with his band 6th Day, at the time of his audition. 
 A rumors about finalist Katharine McPhee circulated during early March and throughout the season. Allegedly, she was quitting the show and would not show up for the March 7 airing. Katharine denied the rumor when interviewed by host Ryan Seacrest on the March 7 show.
 During the March 28 show while Mandisa Hundley was singing, her name and phone number came up, but changed for a few seconds and showed Taylor Hicks' name and phone number. At the end of the show the numbers were right.
 Mandisa Hundley was voted out after country week. The reason behind her elimination was speculated to be what she said before she began to sing her rendition of "Shackles (Praise You)" by Mary Mary: "This song goes out to everybody that wants to be free. Your addiction, lifestyle and situation may be big, but God is bigger." Many viewers believed that the "lifestyle" stated was regarding the homosexual lifestyle, which she denied, clarifying that the lifestyle she was referring to was her lifestyle of addiction to food. Mandisa is a former employee of the Southern Baptist Convention, having joined the Convention in 2000 as a telephone sales representative for their LifeWay book division, and later in their women's enrichment events area, and later Beth Moore's Living Proof Live events. (Moore's books are published by LifeWay.)
 On the April 25 show, the theme of which was Greatest Love Songs and featured guest coaches Andrea Bocelli and David Foster, executive producer Nigel Lythgoe forced contestant Taylor Hicks to change his song a day before air time (and the same day as the dress rehearsal). Hicks' chosen song was "Try a Little Tenderness," but Lythgoe, in a radio interview, claimed the song was more appropriate for a Blues Brothers week and was not a song that Andrea Bocelli would sing. Hicks changed his song at the last minute to "Just Once" (James Ingram) and appeared very uncomfortable on stage. Hicks fans were distressed, feeling that a) Hicks' original choice of song was very appropriate to the theme; b) The producers changed the song at the last minute even though they must have known Hicks' choice the previous week as they must obtain clearance for all songs; c) Lythgoe's statement that it was not a song Andrea Bocelli would sing was dubious, as other song choices that were approved were songs sung by Bryan Adams ("Have You Ever Really Loved a Woman," sung by Chris Daughtry) and Donny Hathaway ("A Song for You," sung by Elliott Yamin).
 During the East Coast transmission of the May 2 show, Paris Bennett was bleeped while singing Mary J. Blige's "Be Without You" at the exact point where an obscenity appears in the lyrics. However, Fox confirmed that the song was not bleeped when it was broadcast on the West Coast. Forum posters on the West Coast said Bennett sang the radio edit of the song which excludes the obscenity, leaving viewers nationwide wondering why Bennett was precensored during the earlier live transmission. Paris was eliminated in the results show the day after.
 Following Chris Daughtry's elimination, many Idol fans claimed calls they dialed to Daughtry's line during the first few minutes of voting were misdirected. According to them, the first of his two numbers was answered by a recording of Katharine McPhee (who was also in the bottom two that night) giving thanks for their vote rather than Daughtry. Others reported similar behavior dialing other lines, such as dialing Elliott Yamin's line and hearing a recording of Daughtry giving thanks for their vote.
 On Top 5 night (May 3), Elliott Yamin performed first, with Taylor Hicks going out last. Next week (May 10, Top 4 night), Katharine McPhee went out last. Yamin was expected to go out last on Top 3 night (May 17), but he was again the first one to sing, losing what is called the "pimp spot", while Hicks was the last one to perform that night. Yamin's fans were distressed stating it was Yamin's right to go out last, while McPhee should have been first, and that the show producers' arranged it to have Yamin eliminated next night (May 18), which actually happened.

U.S. Nielsen ratings
American Idol was the top-rated show for the 2005–06 TV season and occupied the top two positions. The number of viewers for its Tuesday episodes averaged 31.17 million and for the Wednesday episodes 30.16 million. It is still the most-watched of all seasons with an overall average number of viewers of 30.6 million per episode. Its 17.6 household share for the season average still ranks as the highest household share rating for any season-topping series on 21st-century U.S. television.

Post Idol
This is the first season that a majority of finalists have major label recording contracts after Idol. Of them – Taylor Hicks, Katharine McPhee, Elliott Yamin, Chris Daughtry, and Kellie Pickler are distributed by Sony BMG Music Entertainment; Bucky Covington by Universal Music Group; Ace Young and Mandisa by EMI. One other contestant that did not even make the top 24 (Brooke Barrettsmith) was also picked up by Sony BMG, and Universal also picked up Brianna Taylor who also did not make the top 24. Two finalists have a deal with an independent labels – Paris Bennett and Lisa Tucker. Also, six semi-finalists have deals and albums with independent labels – Ayla Brown, Gedeon McKinney (a.k.a. Gedeon Luke), Heather Cox, Patrick Hall, Will Makar, Stevie Scott and David Radford. In addition, at least one contestant who was cut before the semifinals, Bobby Bullard, has also been signed and recorded with a small label.

Taylor Hicks first post-Idol single, "Do I Make You Proud", would debut at number one and be certified gold. Hicks' album, Taylor Hicks, has sold 703,000 copies. He later parted with Arista Records. His follow-up album, "The Distance," was released March 10, 2009, on his own record label Modern Whomp Records.

The fifth-season contestant with the most commercial success is fourth-place finisher Chris Daughtry, now lead singer of the band Daughtry. Their eponymous debut album has sold over 5 million copies to date—surpassing former winners Studdard and Fantasia's respective two-album totals—and produced two top-ten singles. The album, which spent two weeks at number one in the US, is also the fastest-selling debut rock album in Soundscan history.

As of November 2008: Runner-up Katharine McPhee's debut album has sold 374,000 copies; she has two Top 40 Billboard hits. Also notable: sixth-place finisher Kellie Pickler, whose Small Town Girl reached number one on the Billboard Top Country Albums chart and was certified gold. To date it has sold over 815,000 copies. Third-place finisher Elliott Yamin's eponymous debut album was certified gold and produced a platinum-selling single. Eighth-place finisher Bucky Covington's self-titled debut album has sold over 400,000 copies and generated a top 20 and two top 10 hits on the Billboard Hot Country Singles chart. Ninth-place finisher Mandisa's True Beauty album earned a Grammy Award nomination for Best Pop/Contemporary Gospel Album in 2007 and became the most recent Idol alumnus to win in any category at the Grammy Awards for Overcomer for Best Contemporary Christian Music Album in 2014.

Season five is the season from the first ten seasons of American Idol with the most finalists who have made it onto the Billboard charts.

Major releases

Compilations
The compilation album for this season was performed by the top twelve finalists.

Albums

Minor & independent releases

Nominations
In 2006, American Idol also became the most nominated unscripted show ever, and has several nominations in the 2006 Emmy Awards for season five:

Outstanding Reality-Competition Program
Outstanding Art Direction for a Variety, Music Program or Special – Episode #519
Outstanding Directing for a Variety, Music or Comedy Program – Bruce Gowers
Outstanding Picture Editing for Nonfiction Programming (Large team entries – Primarily Multi-Camera Productions) – "Audition City: Greensboro"
Outstanding Lighting Direction – "American Classics Songbook with Rod Stewart"
Outstanding Lighting Direction – "Finale"
Outstanding Sound Mixing for a Variety or Music Series or Special or Animation – "American Classics Songbook with Rod Stewart"
Outstanding Technical Direction, Camerawork, Video for a Series – Episode #530

See also
 American Idols LIVE! Tour 2006

References

External links
 Official American Idol Contestants Website
 

American Idol seasons
2006 American television seasons
Television shows directed by Bruce Gowers